The 20th Anniversary Collection is a 2001 compilation CD by the Canadian new wave synth-pop band Rational Youth, released (as suggested by the title) to commemorate its 20th anniversary. It was their final release, followed by the group's breakup in February, 2002.

Track listing
"Coboloid Race" (Tracy Howe, Bill Vorn) - 4:30
"Everything Is Vapour (Rain)" - (Howe, Jean-Claude Cutz) 4:20
"Saturdays in Silesia" (Howe, Vorn) - 4:06
"Pink Pills, Orange Pills" - 4:24
"Dancing on the Berlin Wall" (Howe, Vorn) - 4:34
"Hot Streets" (Howe, Kevin Komoda) - 3:05
"In Your Eyes" (Howe, Komoda) - 2:54
"The Man in Grey" (Howe) - 3:24
"Money and Blood, Pt. 2" - 3:52
"I Want to See the Light" (Howe, Vorn) - 3:44
"City of Night (Danse Mix)" (Howe, Vorn, Babette Duran) - 7:10
"Holiday in Bangkok (live in Helsingborg 1998)" (Howe) - 5:10
"Close to Nature (DIN & Infor/Mental remix)" (Howe, Vorn) - 6:40

Personnel
 Tracy Howe - vocals, synthesizers
 Bill Vorn - synthesizers, vocoder, programming
 Kevin Komoda - synthesizer, keyboard
 Angel Calvo - drums, percussion
 Denis Duran - bass guitar
 Jean-Claude Cutz - synthesizer
 Dave Rout - synthesizer

References 

2001 greatest hits albums
Rational Youth albums